Alexander G. Hauptmann is a Research Professor in the Language Technologies Institute at the Carnegie Mellon University School of Computer Science.  He has been the leader of the Informedia Digital Library which has made seminal strides in multimedia information retrieval and won best paper awards at major conferences. He was also a founder of the international advisory committee for TRECVID.

Biography 
Alex Hauptmann started at the Johns Hopkins University in 1978 and received a BA and an MA in Psychology in 1982. For two years he studied Computer Science at the Technische Universitaet Berlin. In 1991 he received a PhD in Computer Science from the Carnegie Mellon University.

From 1984 he was researcher at the Carnegie Mellon University in the CMU speech group.  The next two years he was a research associate at the School of Computer Science, since 1994 a System Scientist and since 1998 a Senior System Scientist.

In 2003 he received the Allen Newell Award for Research Excellence, for the Informedia Digital Library, with H. Wactlar, M. Christel, T. Kanade and S. Stevens.

Work 
His research interests are in multimedia analysis and indexing, speech recognition, speech synthesis, speech interfaces, interfaces to multimedia systems and language in general. According to Hauptmann (2008) "Over the years his research interests have led him to pursue and combine several different areas of research: man-machine communication, natural language processing and speech understanding".

In the area of man-machine communication, According to Hauptmann (2008) "he is interested in the tradeoffs between different modalities, including gestures and speech, and in the intuitiveness of interaction protocols. In natural language processing, his desire is to break through the bottlenecks that are currently preventing larger scale natural language applications. The latter theme was also the focus of my thesis, which investigated the use of machine learning on large text samples to acquire the knowledge needed for semantic natural language understanding".

References

External links 
 Home page
 Informedia Project

American non-fiction writers
Living people
Year of birth missing (living people)